Rhagium americanum is a species of beetle in the family Cerambycidae. It was described by Podany in 1964.

References

Lepturinae
Beetles described in 1964